Marx Got It Right is a Chinese talk show commemorating the 200th birthday of Karl Marx (1818–1883). China Central Television ran the five-episode series from 27 April to 1 May 2018. The Communist Party of China's websites promoted the series, which is hosted by Wu Xuelan and features cartoons and anecdotes to describe Marx's theory of how society works.

Chris Buckley of The New York Times describes Marx Got It Right as "a slickly produced program that is part talk show, part indoctrination session – and a vivid illustration of the quirky efforts that the Communist Party under General Secretary Xi Jinping is making to win over China's millennials."

References

External links
  (in Chinese)

Chinese television talk shows
2018 Chinese television series debuts
2018 Chinese television series endings
China Central Television original programming
Works about Karl Marx